Storm8 Inc. is a mobile social game developer founded in 2009 by former Zynga designer, Garrett J. Remes, as well as former Facebook engineers, including Perry Tam, William Siu, Chak Ming Li, and Laura Yip in Redwood Shores, California. Notable games include the Restaurant Story franchise, Dragon Story, Bubble Mania, Fantasy Forest Story, Castle Story and iMobsters.

In 2015, the company had more than 50 million monthly active users and more than 1 billion downloads on iOS and Android. The company also published games under the TeamLava, Shark Party and FireMocha brands, until it consolidated it under Storm8 Studios in March 2015.

History & milestones
In June 2011, Storm8 was one of the first free-to-play mobile game publishers to announce that they earned $1 million in a single day. The following year, technology news site TechCrunch referred to Storm8 as the "quiet mobile gaming giant" for successfully building one of the biggest mobile social gaming networks without raising any venture capital funding, and remaining relatively quiet with the press.

In December 2012, the company celebrated 2 million game downloads in one day.

In January 2020, Storm8 was acquired by Stillfront Group for US $300 million. The acquisition was completed in February 2020.

Expansion moves
In 2014 the company appointed game industry veterans, adding Disney, EA and Zynga experience to its leadership team.

The company announced a deal with Hasbro Inc. in December 2014 to launch Monopoly Bingo! and Clue Bingo! on iOS and Android. These games were later rebranded as Bingo Tycoon! in January of 2021.

In June 2019, the company partnered with the Property Brothers to launch Property Brothers Home Design on iOS and Android.

Games

References

External links
 

Video game companies established in 2009
Video game companies of the United States
Companies based in Redwood Shores, California